Bihar is home to 4 Central Universities, 8 Institutes of National Importance, 2 Deemed Universities, 18 State Universities, 2 Centrally Funded Eminent Institutes, and 7 Private Universities. The following is a list of institutions of higher education in Bihar, India.

Central Universities

Institutes of National Importance

Deemed Universities

Centrally Funded Eminent Institutes 

 National Institute of Fashion Technology Patna
 Institute of Hotel Management, Catering Technology & Applied Nutrition, Hajipur

State Universities 
In Bihar, there are eighteen state universities, which are currently functional.

 Bihar University of health sciences.           Bihar engineering University

Private Universities

Medical Colleges 
As of June 2018, Bihar has 14 functional medical colleges, out of which 9 are owned by the state government, 3 are private medical colleges and two autonomous organisations – IGIMS and AIIMS Patna.

Dental colleges 
Government
 Patna Dental College

Private
 Buddha Institute of Dental Sciences & Hospital, Kankarbagh, Patna
 Dr. B.R. Ambedkar Institute of Dental Sciences & Hospital, Patna	
 Mithila Minority Dental College and Hospital, Laheriasarai, Darbhanga
 Dr. B.R Ambedkar Institute of Dental Sciences & Hospital, Patna
 Dr. S.M. Naqui Imam Dental College & Hospital, Darbhanga
 Sarjug Dental College, Darbhanga

MCA colleges 
 L.N Mishra institute of economic development and social change, Patna
 A N College, Patna
 Gaya College, Gaya
 L.N Mishra College, Muzaffarpur
 Vaishali College, Muzaffarpur

MBA colleges 
 L.N.Mishra College of Business Management,Muzaffarpur(oldest in Bihar)
 A N College, Patna
 International School of Management, Patna
 Indian Institute of Management Bodh Gaya, Gaya
 Catalyst Institute of Management and Advance Global Excellence, Patna
 Chandragupt Institute of Management, Patna
 College of Commerce, Arts and Science, Patna
 Cybotech campus, Patna
 J.D. Women's College, Patna
 L.N. Mishra Institute of Economic Development and Social Change, Patna
 Narayan School of Managerial Excellence, Jamuhar, Sasaram

Agricultural Institutes 
Bihar Agricultural University, Sabour
 Bihar Agricultural College, Sabour
 Bhola Paswan Shastri Agricultural College, Purnea
 Mandan Bharti Agriculture College, Agwanpur
 Nalanda College of Horticulture, Noorsarai
 Dr. Kalam Agricultural College, Kishanganj
 Veer Kunwar Singh College of Agriculture, Dumraon
 College of Agri-Business Management, Patna

Dr. Rajendra Prasad Central Agricultural University, Pusa
College of Agricultural Engineering and Technology, Pusa
Trihut College of Agriculture, Dholi
College of Fisheries, Dholi
College of Community Science, Pusa
College of Basic Sciences & Humanities, Pusa
Post Graduate College of Agriculture, Pusa
School of Agri-Business and Rural Management, Pusa
Pt. Deen Dayal Upadhyay College of Horticulture Forestry,  Piprakothi 

Bihar Animal Sciences University
 Bihar Veterinary College, Patna
 College of Fisheries, Kishanganj
Sanjay Gandhi Institute of Dairy Technology

Mandan Bharti Agricultural College, Saharsa

Narayan School of Agricultural Science, Jamuhar, Sasaram

Munger Forestry college, Munger

Fashion, Art and Design 
 A N College, Patna
 Footwear Design and Development Institute, Patna (FDDI Patna)
 National Institute of Fashion Technology, Patna (NIFT Patna)

Hotel Management 
 Institute of Hotel Management, Catering Technology & Applied Nutrition, Hajipur

Law Institutes 
 Chanakya National Law University
 Central university of South Bihar (school of law and governance), GAYA
 R.M.M. Law College, Saharsa
 Anugrah Memorial Law college, Gaya
 B.M.T. Law College, Purnea
 Bidheh Law College, Madhubani
 Bihar Institute of Law, Patna
 Chanakya National Law University, Patna
 Mahadeo Singh Law College, Bhagalpur
 S.K.J. Law College, Muzaffarpur
 Samastipur Law College, Samastipur
 Vishwanath Singh Law College, Munger
 Narayan School of Law, Jamuhar, Sasaram

Research Institutes 
 Jagjivan Ram Institute of Parliamentary Studies & Political Research, Patna (JRIPSPR Patna)
 A N Sinha Institute of Social Studies, Patna (ICSSR - ANSISS Patna)
 Rajendra Memorial Research Institute of Medical Sciences, Patna (ICMR - RMRIMS)
 Centre for Development of Advanced Computing, Patna (C-DAC Patna)
 Centre for Development Practice and Research, Patna (TISS - CDPR Patna)

Engineering Colleges 
, there are 5 central government, 38 government engineering colleges in the public sector, and 17 engineering colleges in the private sector in Bihar, and 2 government-aided BIT Patna and Women's Institute of Technology, Darbhanga. The overall annual intake of these technical institutes offering engineering education to students in Bihar is approx 10000. Bihar government has planned to establish and incorporate a University in the name of Bihar Engineering University in the State of Bihar to conduct and facilitate affiliation of institutions set up by the Government and/or the Trust or Society or Company in the conventional as well as new frontiers of Engineering & Technology, Architecture and Planning, Management Programme and also to achieve excellence in teaching, research and extension work in these areas. A list of engineering colleges is listed below.

Central government 
Indian Institute of Technology, Patna (IIT Patna)
National Institute of Technology, Patna (NIT Patna)
Indian Institute of Information Technology, Bhagalpur (IIIT Bhagalpur)
 Central Institute of Petrochemicals Engineering and Technology, Hajipur (CIPET Hajipur)
 Indian Railways Institute of Mechanical and Electrical Engineering, Jamalpur (IRIMEE Jamalpur)

State Government

State Government Aided 

 BIT Mesra Extension Centre, Patna
 Dr. APJ Abdul Kalam Women's Institute of Technology, Darbhanga

Private 
 Buddha Institute of Technology, Gaya
 Maulana Azad College of Engineering and Technology, Patna
 Millia Institute of Technology, Purnea
 Moti Babu Institute of Technology, Forbesganj
 Netaji Subhas Institute of Technology, Bihta
 Patna Sahib College of Engineering & Technology, Vaishali
 R.P. Sharma Institute of Technology, Patna
 Vidya Vihar Institute of Technology, Purnea
 Vidyadaan Institute of Technology and Management, Buxar
 Sityog Institute of Technology , Aurangabad

See also 
 List of educational institutions in Patna

References

External links 
 UGC 
 SBTE, BIHAR 
 Shiksha.com 

Education in Bihar
Bihar